The Lilly Arbor Project is a part of an experimental riparian floodplain reforestation and ecological restoration program, located along the White River in Indianapolis, Indiana, in the eastern United States.

Project
The riparian forest restoration project was performed by the department of Center of Earth and Environmental Science (CEES) at Indiana University-Purdue University Indianapolis (IUPUI), It is supported by the Lilly Endowment.

As a part of the riparian zone restoration project, 1,400 trees were planted along the White River in downtown Indianapolis, Indiana. The initial planting occurred in the fall 1999 and the spring of 2000.

After five years, the Lilly Arbor Project provided data on riparian zone reforestation strategies, which will be used in further research and future projects. Students and faculty from various universities conduct research and maintain the restoration using the CEES service learning program.

Trees
The native trees historically in the riparian "restoration study zone" include:
Platanus occidentalis (Sycamore)
Populus deltoides (Cottonwood)
Salix amygdaloides (Black Walnut)
Salix discolor (
Salix nigra
Ulmus thomasii
Ulmus americana

See also 
	
Ecological restoration
Buffer strip
Riparian buffer
Erosion control
Riparian zone restoration
Stream restoration
Riparian terminology
Biodiversity
Conservation biology
Global warming
Habitat
Habitat conservation
Natural environment
Plant community

References

External links
 Center of Earth and Environmental Sciences: The Lilly Arbor Project website

Riparian zone
Forests of Indiana
Parks in Indianapolis
Environment of Indiana
Forestry in the United States
Forestry initiatives